Robrecht Heyvaert is a Belgian cinematographer. He is best known for his work on features including Bad Boys for Life, Revenge and Black and TV series like Ms. Marvel and Snowfall.
He collaborated with director Robin Pront on The Ardennes (2015), for which he received the Best Cinematography Award at the Ensor Awards. They teamed up again on Zillion in 2022
He also was nominated thrice for the Best Cinematography Award at the Ensor Awards. Heyvaert has collaborated with directors Adil El Arbi and Bilall Fallah on 3 Belgian features Gangsta (2018), Black (2015) and Image (2014), before working together on Bad Boys for Life. 
His TV work includes Snowfall (TV series) for which he worked on the pilot and the Disney+ series Ms. Marvel.

Filmography 
 2022: Ms. Marvel (TV series) 
 2020: Bad Boys for Life
 2019: Torpedo
 2018: The Bouncer
 2018: Gangsta
 2018: Revenge
 2017: Snowfall (TV series)
 2017: Blind Spot
 2016: Everybody Happy
 2015: The Ardennes
 2015: Black
 2014:  Image

References
The information in this article is based on that in its Dutch equivalent.

External links

Living people
Belgian cinematographers
Year of birth missing (living people)